Events in the year 1984 in Brazil.

Incumbents

Federal government
 President: General João Figueiredo
 Vice President: Aureliano Chaves

Governors 
 Acre: Nabor Júnior
 Alagoas: Divaldo Suruagy 
 Amazonas: Gilberto Mestrinho 
 Bahia: João Durval Carneiro 
 Ceará: Gonzaga Mota 
 Espírito Santo: Gerson Camata 
 Goiás: Iris Rezende 
 Maranhão: Luís Rocha 
 Mato Grosso: Julio Campos 
 Mato Grosso do Sul: Wilson Barbosa Martins 
 Minas Gerais: Tancredo Neves (until 14 August); Hélio Garcia (from 14 August)
 Pará: Jader Barbalho 
 Paraíba: Wilson Braga
 Paraná: José Richa
 Pernambuco: Roberto Magalhães 
 Piauí: Hugo Napoleão  
 Rio de Janeiro: Leonel Brizola
 Rio Grande do Norte: José Agripino Maia 
 Rio Grande do Sul: Jair de Oliveira Soares
 Rondônia: Jorge Teixeira de Oliveira 
 Santa Catarina: Esperidião Amin 
 São Paulo: André Franco Montoro 
 Sergipe: João Alves Filho

Vice governors
 Acre: Iolanda Ferreira Lima Fleming 
 Alagoas: José de Medeiros Tavares 
 Amazonas: Manoel Henriques Ribeiro 
 Bahia: Edvaldo de Oliveira Flores 
 Ceará: José Adauto Bezerra
 Espírito Santo: José Moraes 
 Goiás: Onofre Quinan 
 Maranhão: João Rodolfo Ribeiro Gonçalves 
 Mato Grosso: Wilmar Peres de Faria 
 Mato Grosso do Sul: Ramez Tebet
 Minas Gerais: Hélio Garcia (until 14 August); vacant thereafter (from 14 August)
 Pará: Laércio Dias Franco 
 Paraíba: José Carlos da Silva Júnior 
 Paraná: João Elísio Ferraz de Campos 
 Pernambuco: Gustavo Krause Gonçalves Sobrinho 
 Piauí: José Raimundo Bona Medeiros 
 Rio de Janeiro: Darcy Ribeiro
 Rio Grande do Norte: Radir Pereira 
 Rio Grande do Sul: Cláudio Ênio Strassburger 
 Santa Catarina: Victor Fontana 
 São Paulo: Orestes Quércia 
 Sergipe: Antônio Carlos Valadares

Events

Births
January 2 - Otacílio Jales, footballer
February 16 - Fábio Lucindo, actor, voice actor and presenter 
April 10 - Alemão, footballer (died 2007)
July 5 - Henrique Barbosa, swimmer
September 22 – Thiago Silva, footballer
October 19 – Kaio de Almeida, swimmer

Deaths

References

See also 
1984 in Brazilian football
1984 in Brazilian television
List of Brazilian films of 1984

 
1980s in Brazil
Years of the 20th century in Brazil
Brazil
Brazil